A Lie bialgebroid is a mathematical structure in the area of non-Riemannian differential geometry. In brief a Lie bialgebroid are two compatible Lie algebroids defined on dual vector bundles.  They form the vector bundle version of a Lie bialgebra.

Definition

Preliminary notions 
Remember that a Lie algebroid is defined as a skew-symmetric operation [.,.] on the sections Γ(A) of a vector bundle A→M over a smooth manifold M together with a vector bundle morphism ρ: A→TM subject to the Leibniz rule

and Jacobi identity

where Φ, ψk are sections of A and f is a smooth function on M.

The Lie bracket [.,.]A can be extended to multivector fields Γ(⋀A) graded symmetric via the Leibniz rule

for homogeneous multivector fields Φ, Ψ, Χ.

The Lie algebroid differential is an R-linear operator dA on the A-forms ΩA(M) = Γ(⋀A*) of degree 1 subject to the Leibniz-rule

for A-forms α and β.  It is uniquely characterized by the conditions

and

for functions f on M, A-1-forms α∈Γ(A*) and Φ, ψ sections of A.

The definition
A Lie bialgebroid are two Lie algebroids (A,ρA,[.,.]A) and (A*,ρ*,[.,.]*) on dual vector bundles A→M and A*→M subject to the compatibility

for all sections Φ, ψ of A.
Here d* denotes the Lie algebroid differential of A* which also operates on the multivector fields Γ(∧A).

Symmetry of the definition 
It can be shown that the definition is symmetric in A and A*, i.e. (A,A*) is a Lie bialgebroid iff (A*,A) is.

Examples 
1. A Lie bialgebra are two Lie algebras (g,[.,.]g) and (g*,[.,.]*) on dual vector spaces g and g* such that the Chevalley–Eilenberg differential δ* is a derivation of the g-bracket.

2. A Poisson manifold (M,π) gives naturally rise to a Lie bialgebroid on TM (with the commutator bracket of tangent vector fields) and T*M with the Lie bracket induced by the Poisson structure.  The T*M-differential is d*= [π, .] and the compatibility follows then from the Jacobi-identity of the Schouten bracket.

Infinitesimal version of a Poisson groupoid 
It is well known that the infinitesimal version of a Lie groupoid is a Lie algebroid.  (As a special case the infinitesimal version of a Lie group is a Lie algebra.)  Therefore, one can ask which structures need to be differentiated in order to obtain a Lie bialgebroid.

Definition of Poisson groupoid 
A Poisson groupoid is a Lie groupoid (G⇉M) together with a Poisson structure π on G such that the multiplication graph m ⊂ G×G×(G,−) is coisotropic.  An example of a Poisson Lie groupoid is a Poisson Lie group (where M=pt, just a point).  Another example is a symplectic groupoid (where the Poisson structure is non-degenerate on TG).

Differentiation of the structure 
Remember the construction of a Lie algebroid from a Lie groupoid.  We take the t-tangent fibers (or equivalently the s-tangent fibers) and consider their vector bundle pulled back to the base manifold M.  A section of this vector bundle can be identified with a G-invariant t-vector field on G which form a Lie algebra with respect to the commutator bracket on TG.

We thus take the Lie algebroid A→M of the Poisson groupoid.  It can be shown that the Poisson structure induces a fiber-linear Poisson structure on A.  Analogous to the construction of the cotangent Lie algebroid of a Poisson manifold there is a Lie algebroid structure on A* induced by this Poisson structure.  Analogous to the Poisson manifold case one can show that A and A* form a Lie bialgebroid.

Double of a Lie bialgebroid and superlanguage of Lie bialgebroids 
For Lie bialgebras (g,g*) there is the notion of Manin triples, i.e. c=g+g* can be endowed with the structure of a Lie algebra such that g and g* are subalgebras and c contains the representation of g on g*, vice versa.  The sum structure is just
.

Courant algebroids 
It turns out that the naive generalization to Lie algebroids does not give a Lie algebroid any more.  Instead one has to modify either the Jacobi identity or violate the skew-symmetry and is thus lead to Courant algebroids.

Superlanguage 
The appropriate superlanguage of a Lie algebroid A is ΠA, the supermanifold whose space of (super)functions are the A-forms.  On this space the Lie algebroid can be encoded via its Lie algebroid differential, which is just an odd vector field.

As a first guess the super-realization of a Lie bialgebroid (A,A*) should be ΠA+ΠA*. But unfortunately dA +d*|ΠA+ΠA* is not a differential, basically because A+A* is not a Lie algebroid.  Instead using the larger N-graded manifold T*[2]A[1] = T*[2]A*[1] to which we can lift dA and d* as odd Hamiltonian vector fields, then their sum squares to 0 iff (A,A*) is a Lie bialgebroid.

References 

 C. Albert and P. Dazord: Théorie des groupoïdes symplectiques: Chapitre II, Groupoïdes symplectiques. (in Publications du Département de Mathématiques de l’Université Claude Bernard, Lyon I, nouvelle série, pp. 27–99, 1990)
 Y. Kosmann-Schwarzbach: The Lie bialgebroid of a Poisson–Nijenhuis manifold. (Lett. Math. Phys., 38:421–428, 1996)
 K. Mackenzie, P. Xu: Integration of Lie bialgebroids (1997),
 K. Mackenzie, P. Xu: Lie bialgebroids and Poisson groupoids (Duke J. Math, 1994)
 A. Weinstein: Symplectic groupoids and Poisson manifolds (AMS Bull, 1987),

Symplectic geometry